Stephen Krecklo is a Canadian musician. He is most noted as a two-time Canadian Screen Award nominee for Best Original Score, receiving nods at the 8th Canadian Screen Awards in 2020 for James vs. His Future Self and at the 10th Canadian Screen Awards in 2022 for Between Waves.

His other credits have included the films The Go-Getters, Queen of the Morning Calm and Daniel's Gotta Die. He is usually, but not always, credited in collaboration with Ian LeFeuvre.

References

External links

21st-century Canadian composers
Canadian film score composers
Canadian television composers
Musicians from Toronto
Living people
Year of birth missing (living people)